The 1983–84 season was the 75th year of football played by Dundee United, and covers the period from 1 July 1983 to 30 June 1984. United finished in third place, securing UEFA Cup football for the following season. Having won the Scottish Premier Division the previous season, the Terrors entered the European Cup for their first and only campaign in Europe’s elite competition, reaching the semi-finals before narrowly losing to AS Roma, the Italian side later admitting to having attempted to bribe the match referee.

Match results
Dundee United played a total of 58 competitive matches during the 1983–84 season. The team finished third in the Scottish Premier Division.

Legend

All results are written with Dundee United's score first.
Own goals in italics

Premier Division

Scottish Cup

League Cup

European Cup

League table

References

See also
 1983–84 in Scottish football

Dundee United F.C. seasons
Dundee United